The external capsule is a series of white matter fiber tracts in the brain. These fibers run between the most lateral (toward the side of the head) segment of the lentiform nucleus (more specifically the putamen) and the claustrum.

The white matter of the external capsule contains fibers known as corticocortical association fibers. These fibers are responsible for connecting the cerebral cortex to another cortical area. The capsule itself appears as a thin white sheet of white matter.

The external capsule is a route for cholinergic fibers from the basal forebrain to the cerebral cortex.

The putamen separates the external capsule from the internal capsule medially and the claustrum separates it from the extreme capsule laterally. But the external capsule eventually joins the internal capsule around the lentiform nucleus.

Additional images

See also 
 Internal capsule
 Extreme capsule

References

External links

 
 Image at Univ. of South Carolina

Cerebrum